Schouler is a surname. Notable people with the surname include:

James Schouler (1839–1920), American lawyer and historian
William Schouler (1814–1872), American journalist, politician, and general

See also
Schuler